The 2008–09 season was the seventy-seventh season in which football club Gillingham F.C. competed in the Football League, and the fifty-ninth since the club's return to the League in 1950. Gillingham finished the season in fifth place in Football League Two, gaining promotion to League One through play-off victories over Rochdale (over two legs) and Shrewsbury Town.

The club also reached the third round of the FA Cup, before being defeated by Aston Villa.

Football League 

Pld = Matches played; W = Matches won; D = Matches drawn; L = Matches lost; F = Goals for; A = Goals against; Pts = Points

Play-offs

FA Cup 
As a League Two club, Gillingham entered the FA Cup at the first round stage. Bury were defeated by a second-half Andy Barcham goal at Gigg Lane, earning Gillingham a second round tie against Stockport County of League One. The first game ended goalless at the Priestfield Stadium, before the Gills came from behind to win 2–1 at Edgeley Park. Premier League side Aston Villa proved too strong for Gillingham in the third round, eventually winning 2–1 in a televised fixture.

Football League Cup

Football League Trophy

Squad statistics 
Gillingham used a total of 28 players during the course of the season, although none played in all 55 competitive matches. John Nutter made the most appearances during the season, with Gillingham's 4–4 draw with Aldershot Town being the only game he did not take part in (he was an unused substitute). Simeon Jackson finished as the club's top goalscorer, finding the net on 21 occasions.

See also 
 Gillingham F.C. seasons

References 
Specific:

General:
 
 

Gillingham F.C. seasons
Gillingham